The 45th Canadian federal election will take place on or before October 20, 2025, to elect members of the House of Commons to the 45th Canadian Parliament.

The date of the vote is determined by the fixed-date provisions of the Canada Elections Act, which requires federal elections to be held on the third Monday in October in the fourth calendar year after the polling day of the previous election. In addition to the statutory fixed election date provisions, Canada has a constitutional requirement specified in both section 50 of the Constitution Act, 1867 and section 4 of the Canadian Charter of Rights and Freedoms that elections for the House of Commons must be held no more than five years after the preceding election.

Since the incumbent government is a minority government, the election may occur before the scheduled date if the governor general dissolves Parliament on the recommendation of the prime minister for a snap election, for example after the House of Commons passes a motion of no confidence in the government.

Background
The 2021 Canadian federal election, held on September 20 that year, resulted in the incumbent Liberal Party, led by Prime Minister Justin Trudeau, retaining government and their minority status parliament, whilst also picking up five more seats than they had at dissolution. On September 27, Annamie Paul announced that she was resigning as the Green Party leader; on November 10, she stated she had formally resigned and left the Green Party.

The Constitution Act, 1867, requires that federal electoral districts undergo a redistribution of seats following each decennial Canadian census. The 2022 redistribution began in October 2021, and is expected to be completed in September 2023. On October 15, the chief electoral officer announced that allocation would result in an increase to 342 seats. The government tabled legislation on March 24, 2022, to prevent Quebec (or any other province) from losing any seats relative to the number of seats it was apportioned in 2012 Canadian federal electoral redistribution. Bill C-14 amended rule 2 of subsection 51(1) of the Constitution Act, 1867, commonly known as the "Grandfather Clause". The bill passed the House of Commons on June 15, the Senate on June 21, and received royal assent on June 23. The chief electoral officer announced the new allocation of seats on July 8, which would result in an increase to 343 seats.

Parties and standings
The table below lists parties represented in the House of Commons after the 2021 federal election and their current standings. Kevin Vuong was elected as a Liberal, having been disavowed by the party too late to alter his affiliation on the ballot, and sits as an independent.

Incumbents not running for re-election

Timeline

2021
September 27 – Annamie Paul announced her intent to resign as leader of the Green Party.
November 10 – Paul formally submited her resignation, and ended her membership in the party. The Green Party accepted her resignation a few days later.
November 15 – Senator Denise Batters launched a petition to review the leadership of Erin O'Toole. Party president Robert Batherson decided the petition was not in order. The following day, Batters was removed from the conservative caucus.
November 24 – Amita Kuttner was appointed as Green Party interim leader.
December 5 – The People's Party concluded its leadership review of Maxime Bernier. He was confirmed and continued as leader.

2022 
February 2 – Erin O'Toole was removed as the leader of the Conservative Party, by a caucus vote. Candice Bergen was selected by the party caucus to serve as interim leader.
March 22 – The Liberal and New Democratic parties reached a confidence and supply agreement, with the NDP agreeing to support the Liberal government until June 2025 in exchange for specific policy commitments.
May 24 – The 2022 Green Party of Canada leadership election officially began, pursuant to the party's constitution.
 May 28 – Liberal Sven Spengemann resigned as the MP of Mississauga–Lakeshore to accept a role in the United Nations.
September 10 – The 2022 Conservative Party of Canada leadership election concluded. Pierre Poilievre was announced as the new leader of the Conservative Party of Canada.
 September 13 – MP Alain Rayes left the Conservative Party to sit as an independent.
 November 19 – The 2022 Green Party of Canada leadership election was concluded. Elizabeth May was announced as the new leader of the Green Party of Canada.
 December 12 – Liberal MP for Winnipeg South Centre Jim Carr died of cancer.
 December 12 – A federal by-election was held in Mississauga–Lakeshore, with Liberal Charles Sousa elected.
 December 12 – Bob Benzen resigned as the Member of Parliament for Calgary Heritage.

2023 
 January 27  – Dave MacKenzie resigned as the Member of Parliament for Oxford.
 February 28 – Candice Bergen resigned as the Member of Parliament for Portage—Lisgar.
 March 8 – Marc Garneau resigned as the Member of Parliament for Notre-Dame-de-Grâce—Westmount.

Opinion polls

Notes

References

Federal, 45
2025